Apagomerina utiariti is a species of beetle in the family Cerambycidae. It was described by Galileo and Martins in 1989. It is known from Brazil.

References

utiariti
Beetles described in 1989